Rose Hill Cemetery may refer to:

United Kingdom
 Rose Hill Cemetery, Oxford

United States

Rose Hill Cemetery (Arkadelphia, Arkansas)
Rose Hill Cemetery (Antioch, California), in the Black Diamond Mines Regional Preserve
Rose Hill Cemetery, Nortonville, California
Rose Hill Cemetery, Commerce City, Colorado
Rose Hill Cemetery (Tarpon Springs, Florida), on the National Register of Historic Places for Pinellas County, Florida
Rose Hill Cemetery (Macon, Georgia), listed on the NRHP in Georgia
 Rose Hill Cemetery, Royston, a cemetery in Georgia
 Rose Hill Cemetery and Goddard Chapel, Marion, Illinois
Rose Hill Cemetery, Bloomington, Indiana
Rose Hill Cemetery, Elizabeth, Indiana
Rose Hill Cemetery, Cain Township, Fountain County, Indiana
Rose Hill Cemetery, Albion Township, Noble County, Indiana
Rose Hill Cemetery, Calamus, Iowa
Rose Hill Cemetery, Central City, a cemetery in Kentucky
Rose Hill Cemetery (Maryland)
Rose Hill Cemetery, Volinia Township, Michigan
Rose Hill Cemetery, Meridian, Mississippi
Rose Hill Cemetery, Massillon, a cemetery in Ohio
Rose Hill Cemetery (Columbia, Tennessee)
Rose Hill Cemetery (Texarkana, Texas)

See also 

 Rose Hill Burial Park (Oklahoma City, Oklahoma)
 Rose Hills Memorial Park, in Whittier, California